2754 Efimov, provisionally named , is a stony asteroid and binary system from the inner regions of the asteroid belt, approximately 5 kilometers in diameter. It was discovered on 13 August 1966, by Russian astronomer Tamara Smirnova at the Crimean Astrophysical Observatory in Nauchnyj, on the Crimean peninsula. The asteroid was named after Russian aviator Mikhail Efimov.

Orbit and classification 

Efimov orbits the Sun in the inner main-belt at a distance of 1.7–2.7 AU once every 3 years and 4 months (1,214 days). Its orbit has an eccentricity of 0.23 and an inclination of 6° with respect to the ecliptic.

Physical characteristics 

In the SMASS classification, Efimov is a Sa-type asteroid, which belong to the larger group of S-type asteroids. It is also characterized as a L-type asteroid by PanSTARRS photometric survey.

The Collaborative Asteroid Lightcurve Link assumes a standard albedo for stony asteroids of 0.20 and derives a diameter of 4.98 kilometers with an absolute magnitude of 13.92.

Satellite 

Efimov is a binary asteroid. In 2006, astronomers discovered a minor-planet moon, designated  around Efimov using lightcurve observations, with a diameter of 1.29 kilometers and an orbital period of 14 hours and 46 minutes.

Naming 

This minor planet named in memory of Russian aviator Mikhail Nikiforovich Efimov (1881–1919), who was the first to realize steep turns and dives.

The approved naming citation was published by the Minor Planet Center on 31 May 1988.

References

External links 
 First in the sky: Mikhail Efimov is a pioneer of Russian aviation
 Asteroids with Satellites, Robert Johnston, johnstonsarchive.net
 Asteroid Lightcurve Database (LCDB), query form (info )
 Dictionary of Minor Planet Names, Google books
 Asteroids and comets rotation curves, CdR – Observatoire de Genève, Raoul Behrend
 Discovery Circumstances: Numbered Minor Planets (1)-(5000) – Minor Planet Center
 
 

002754
Discoveries by Tamara Mikhaylovna Smirnova
Named minor planets
002754
002754
19660813